Bulamaji (also Romanized as Būlāmājī; also known as Balā Mājī, Bolāmājī, Bulamachi, and Būlāmājeh) is a village in Bonab Rural District, in the Central District of Zanjan County, Zanjan Province, Iran. At the 2006 census, its population was 421, in 109 families.

References 

Populated places in Zanjan County